Saint Monica's Players (SMP) is an amateur dramatic society based in Enfield.

It was formed in 1958 out of the Saint Monica's church of Palmers Green. The group has performed over 200 different plays and musicals at local theatres and drama festivals and competitions. They produce three shows per year; a summer show at the Millfield Theatre in June, a pantomime at the Intimate Theatre in January and a night of one act plays.

Pantomimes are written by resident writer Warren McWilliams, whose work is published by Lazy Bee Scripts and StageScripts Ltd.

Notes

Amateur theatre companies in England
Cultural organisations based in London